Streptomyces gardneri is a bacterium species from the genus of Streptomyces. Streptomyces gardneri produces thiopeptide A, proactinomycin A, proactinomycin B, proactinomycin C.

See also 
 List of Streptomyces species

References

Further reading

External links
Type strain of Streptomyces gardneri at BacDive -  the Bacterial Diversity Metadatabase

gardneri
Bacteria described in 1961